Luis Fernando Patiño Arzuza (born October 26, 1999) is a Colombian professional baseball pitcher for the Tampa Bay Rays of Major League Baseball (MLB). He has previously played in MLB for the San Diego Padres.

Career

San Diego Padres
On July 2, 2016, Patiño signed with the San Diego Padres as an international free agent. He spent the 2017 season with the Dominican Summer League Padres and Arizona League Padres, going 4–2 with a 2.25 ERA in 13 games (12 starts) between the two clubs.

In 2018, Patiño played with the Fort Wayne TinCaps. where he pitched to a 6–3 record, a 2.16 ERA, and a 1.07 WHIP in 17 starts. He began the 2019 season with the Lake Elsinore Storm, and he was named to the 2019 All-Star Futures Game. He was promoted to the Amarillo Sod Poodles in August. Over twenty games (19 starts) between the two teams, Patiño went 6–8 with a 2.57 ERA, striking out 123 over  innings.

On August 4, 2020, Patiño was called up to the major leagues. At the time, he was the youngest player in MLB. He appeared in eleven games in 2020, finishing the season with a 5.14 ERA.

Tampa Bay Rays
On December 29, 2020, Patiño, along with Francisco Mejía, Blake Hunt and Cole Wilcox, was traded to the Tampa Bay Rays in exchange for Blake Snell. At the time of the trade he was ranked the 23rd best prospect in baseball by MLB.com and a top 10 prospect by Fangraphs.

In a start against the Oakland Athletics on April 11, 2022, Patiño was removed with an oblique strain after 13 pitches. He was transferred to the 60-day injured list two days later on April 13.

References

External links

1999 births
Living people
Amarillo Sod Poodles players
Arizona League Padres players
Colombian expatriate baseball players in the United States
Dominican Summer League Padres players
Colombian expatriate baseball players in the Dominican Republic
Durham Bulls players
Fort Wayne TinCaps players
Lake Elsinore Storm players
Major League Baseball pitchers
Major League Baseball players from Colombia
San Diego Padres players
Tampa Bay Rays players
Sportspeople from Barranquilla